The 1983 Soviet Chess Championship was the 50th edition of USSR Chess Championship. Held from 2-28 April 1983 in Moscow. The title was won by  Anatoly Karpov. Semifinals took place in Ivano-Frankivsk, Pavlodar, Sievierodonetsk and Yaroslavl; The First League (also qualifying to the final) wad held at Telavi. There was no final in 1982, the year of the Soviet Zonal (Interzonal qualifying).

Qualifying

Semifinals 
Semifinals took place at Ivano-Frankivsk, Pavlodar, Sievierodonetsk and Yaroslavl in June-July 1982. The winners respectively were Konstantin Lerner, Zurab Azmaiparashvili, Vladimir Malaniuk and Yuri Razuvayev gaining a direct promotion to the final.

First League 
The top two qualified for the final.

Final 
The final was held as late as April 1983 at Moscow with the unusual number of 17 players. Tal was soon ill and withdrew after round ten (after 2 loses, 3 draws and 4 adjourned games). The diagnosis this time was high blood pressure.

References 

USSR Chess Championships
Chess
1983 in chess
1983 in Soviet sport